Candy Rain, also known as 愛情糖果雨, is a 2008 Taiwanese film directed by Chen Hung-I (陳宏一).

Plot 
Candy Rain is a romantic drama which combines four intimate, lyrical tales exploring lesbian relationship in contemporary Taiwan. In the first episode, a young girl escapes a broken love for the uncertainties of friendship (and more) in Taipei. In the second, another girl, seeking her ideal, finds herself involved with a wealthy woman instead. The third story follows a heroine trying to find a balance between marriage and separation from her true love. The final story portrays a volatile foursome anchored by singer-actress Karena Lam. A rich, bittersweet spectrum of love and loss, based on true stories.

Cast 
Karena Lam (林嘉欣) ... Ricky
Cyndi Wang (王心凌) ... Ricky's girlfriend
Josephine Hsu (許安安) ... Ricky's ex-girlfriend
Chia-Hsin Lu (路嘉欣) ... Ricky's ex-girlfriend
Grace Chen (陳泱瑾) ... Pon
Belle Hsin (辛佳穎) ... Jessie
Sandrine Pinna (張榕容) ... U
Waa Wei (魏如萱) ... Lin
Niki Wu (吳立琪) ... Spancer
Kao I-Ling (高伊玲) ... Summer
Flora Sun (孫正華)

Reception
Critical response to the film has been mixed.  Kozo of the Love HK Film website called Candy Rain "a light, lesbian-themed art film that's uneven and obvious in execution," but Russell Edwards of Variety gave the film mild praise for its "charming" performances and "gracefully shot" cinematography.

References

External links
 
 

2008 films
Lesbian-related films
2000s Mandarin-language films
Taiwanese LGBT-related films
2008 LGBT-related films